Hristo Yankov Ivanov (born 16 December 2000) is a Bulgarian professional footballer who plays as a midfielder for Lokomotiv Plovdiv. He played for several English youth teams.  Upon his return to Bulgaria, he became champion of Bulgaria for under 19 with Cherno More. The same year he made his debut in the first division with the team of Vitosha Bistritsa.

Ivanov previously played for Cherno More, Vitosha Bistritsa, Arda Kardzhali and Novara.

References

External links

2000 births
Living people
Bulgarian footballers
Association football midfielders
Bulgaria international footballers
First Professional Football League (Bulgaria) players
Serie C players
FC Vitosha Bistritsa players
Novara F.C. players
FC Arda Kardzhali players
PFC Lokomotiv Plovdiv players
Bulgarian expatriate footballers
Expatriate footballers in Italy